The heats for the Women's 100m Breaststroke race at the 2009 World Championships took place on Monday, 27 July (prelims and semifinals) and Tuesday 28 July (final) at the Foro Italico in Rome, Italy.

Records
Prior to this competition, the existing world and competition records were as follows:

The following records were established during the competition:

Results

Heats

Semifinals

Final

See also
Swimming at the 2007 World Aquatics Championships – Women's 100 metre breaststroke
Swimming at the 2008 Summer Olympics – Women's 100 metre breaststroke

References
Women's 100m Breaststroke Preliminary results from the 2009 World Championships. Published by OmegaTiming.com (official timer of the '09 Worlds); retrieved 2009-07-28.
Women's 100m Breaststroke Semifinals results from the 2009 World Championships. Published by OmegaTiming.com (official timer of the '09 Worlds); retrieved 2009-07-28.
Women's 100m Breaststroke Final results from the 2009 World Championships. Published by OmegaTiming.com (official timer of the '09 Worlds); retrieved 2009-07-28.

Breaststroke Women's 100 m
2009 in women's swimming